The Massacre in the Great Temple, also called the Alvarado Massacre, was an event on May 22, 1520, in the Aztec capital Tenochtitlan during the Conquest of the Aztec Empire, in which the celebration of the Feast of Toxcatl ended in a massacre of Aztec elites.
While Hernán Cortés was in Tenochtitlan, he heard about other Spaniards arriving on the coast – Pánfilo de Narváez had come from Cuba with orders to arrest him  – and Cortés was forced to leave the city to fight them.  During his absence, Moctezuma asked deputy governor Pedro de Alvarado for permission to celebrate Toxcatl (an Aztec festivity in honor of Tezcatlipoca, one of their main gods, which, as popular in Aztec culture, included human sacrifice, in this case of a young man). But after the festivities had started, Alvarado interrupted the celebration, killing all the warriors and noblemen who were celebrating inside the Great Temple. The few who managed to escape the massacre by climbing over the walls informed the community of the Spaniards' atrocity.

The Spanish version of the incident claims the conquistadors intervened to prevent a ritual of human sacrifice in the Templo Mayor; the Aztec version says the Spaniards were enticed into action by the gold the Aztecs were wearing, prompting an Aztec rebellion against the orders of Moctezuma. While differing so on Alvarado's specific motive, both accounts are in basic agreement that the celebrants were unarmed and that the massacre was without warning and unprovoked.

The Aztecs were already antagonistic towards the Spaniards for being inside their city and for holding Moctezuma under house arrest.  When Cortés and his men, including those who had come under Narváez, returned, the Aztecs began full-scale hostilities against the Spaniards.  The Spaniards had no choice but to retreat from the city, which they did on what is called the Sad Night (La Noche Triste), losing most of their men, who were either killed in the battle or were captured and sacrificed.

An Aztec account of the incident
This is part of the Aztec account:

Here it is told how the Spaniards killed, they murdered the Aztecs who were celebrating the Fiesta of Huitzilopochtli in the place they called The Patio of the Gods

At this time, when everyone was enjoying the celebration, when everyone was already dancing, when everyone was already singing, when song was linked to song and the songs roared like waves, in that precise moment the Spaniards determined to kill people. They came into the patio, armed for battle.

They came to close the exits, the steps, the entrances [to the patio]: The Gate of the Eagle in the smallest palace, The Gate of the Canestalk and the Gate of the Snake of Mirrors. And when they had closed them, no one could get out anywhere.

Once they had done this, they entered the Sacred Patio to kill people. They came on foot, carrying swords and wooden and metal shields. Immediately, they surrounded those who danced, then rushed to the place where the drums were played. They attacked the man who was drumming and cut off both his arms. Then they cut off his head [with such a force] that it flew off, falling far away. 

At that moment, they then attacked all the people, stabbing them, spearing them, wounding them with their swords. They struck some from behind, who fell instantly to the ground with their entrails hanging out [of their bodies]. They cut off the heads of some and smashed the heads of others into little pieces.

They struck others in the shoulders and tore their arms from their bodies. They struck some in the thighs and some in the calves. They slashed others in the abdomen and their entrails fell to the earth. There were some who even ran in vain, but their bowels spilled as they ran; they seemed to get their feet entangled with their own entrails. Eager to flee, they found nowhere to go.

Some tried to escape, but the Spaniards murdered them at the gates while they laughed. Others climbed the walls, but they could not save themselves. Others entered the communal house, where they were safe for a while. Others lay down among the victims and pretended to be dead. But if they stood up again they [the Spaniards] would see them and kill them.

The blood of the warriors ran like water as they ran, forming pools, which widened, as the smell of blood and entrails fouled the air.

And the Spaniards walked everywhere, searching the communal houses to kill those who were hiding. They ran everywhere, they searched every place.

When [people] outside [the Sacred Patio learned of the massacre], shouting began, "Captains, Mexicas, come here quickly! Come here with all arms, spears, and shields! Our captains have been murdered! Our warriors have been slain! Oh Mexica captains, [our warriors] have been annihilated!"

Then a roar was heard, screams, people wailed, as they beat their palms against their lips. Quickly the captains assembled, as if planned in advance, and carried their spears and shields. Then the battle began. [The Mexicas] attacked them with arrows and even javelins, including small javelins used for hunting birds. They furiously hurled their javelins [at the Spaniards]. It was as if a layer of yellow canes spread over the Spaniards.  -- Visión de los Vencidos

The Spaniards' account of the incident

Spanish Historian Francisco López de Gómara's account:

Cortes wanted to entirely understand the cause of the Indians' rebellion. He interrogated them [the Spaniards] altogether. Some said it was caused by the message sent by Narváez, others because the people wanted to toss the Spaniards out of the Aztec city [Tenochtitlan], which had been planned as soon as the ships had arrived, because while they were fighting they shouted "Get out!" at them. Others said it was to liberate Moctezuma, for they fought saying, "Free our god and King if you don't want to die!" Still others said it was to steal the gold, silver, and jewels that the Spaniards had, because they heard the Indians say, "Here you shall leave the gold that you have taken!" Again, some said it was to keep the Tlaxcalans and other mortal enemies out of the Aztec lands. Finally, many believed that taking their idols as gods, they had given themselves to the devil.

Any of these things would have been enough to cause the rebellion, not to mention all of them together. But the principal one was that a few days after Cortes left to confront Narváez, it became time for a festival the Mexicas wanted to celebrate in their traditional way. . . . They begged Pedro de Alvarado to give them his permission, so [the Spaniards] wouldn't think that they planned to kill them. Alvarado consented provided that there were no sacrifices, no people killed, and no one had weapons.

More than 600 gentlemen and several lords gathered in the yard of the largest temple; some said there were more than a thousand there. They made a lot of noise with their drums, shells, bugles, and hendidos, which sounded like a loud whistle. Preparing their festival, they were naked, but covered with precious stones, pearls, necklaces, belts, bracelets, many jewels of gold, silver, and mother-of-pearl, wearing very rich feathers on their heads. They performed a dance called the mazeualiztli, which is called that because it is a holiday from work [symbolized by the word for farmer, macehaulli]. . . . They laid mats in the patio of the temple and played drums on them. They danced in circles, holding hands, to the music of the singers, to which they responded.

The songs were sacred, and not profane, and were sung to praise the god honored in the festival, to induce him to provide water and grain, health, and victory, or to thank him for healthy children and other things. And those who knew the language and these ceremonial rites said that when the people danced in the temples, they perform very different from those who danced the netoteliztli, in voice, movement of the body, head, arms, and feet, by which they manifested their concepts of good and evil. The Spaniards called this dance, an areito, a word they brought from the islands of Cuba and Santo Domingo.

While the Mexica gentlemen were dancing in the temple yard of Vitcilopuchtli [Huitzilopochtli], Pedro de Alvarado went there. Whether on [the basis of] his own opinion or in an agreement decided by everyone, I don't know, but some say he had been warned that the Indian nobles of the city had assembled to plot the mutiny and the rebellion, which they later carried out; others, believe that [the Spaniards] went to watch them perform this famous and praised dance, and seeing how rich they were and wanting the gold the Indians were wearing, he [Alvarado] covered each of the entrances with ten or twelve Spaniards and went inside with more than fifty [Spaniards], and without remorse and lacking any Christian piety, they brutally stabbed and killed the Indians, and took what they were wearing.

References

Primary sources

 See also Historia general de las Indias.
 Excerpts of the Florentine Codex, compiled by Fr Bernardino de Sahagún and translated by Nancy Fitch.

External links
 Photographs of the mural depicting the massacre, installed at the Escuela Nacional Preparatoria, México, D.F., that Jean Charlot painted, and preparatory sketches. 

1520 in Mexico
History of the Aztecs
Massacres in Mexico
Massacres in religious buildings and structures
Tenochtitlan
Murder in 1520
Massacres in 1520